A piano quartet is a chamber music composition for piano and three other instruments, or a musical ensemble comprising such instruments.  Those other instruments are usually a string trio consisting of a violin, viola and cello.

Piano quartets for that standard lineup were written by Wolfgang Amadeus Mozart, Robert Schumann, Ludwig van Beethoven, Johannes Brahms, Antonín Dvořák and Gabriel Fauré among others. In the 20th century, composers have also written for more varied groups, with Anton Webern's Quartet, opus 22 (1930), for example, being for piano, violin, clarinet and tenor saxophone, and Paul Hindemith's quartet (1938) as well as Olivier Messiaen's Quatuor pour la fin du temps (1940) both for piano, violin, cello and clarinet. An early example of this can be found in Franz Berwald's quartet for piano, horn, clarinet and bassoon (1819), his opus 1.

A rare form of piano quartets consist of two pianos with two players at each piano. This type of ensemble is informally referred to as "eight-hand piano", or "two piano eight hands". Eight-hand piano was popular in the late 19th century before the advent of recordings as it was a mechanism to reproduce and study symphonic works. Music lovers could hear the major symphonic works all in the convenience of a parlour or music hall that had two pianos and four pianists. Many of the popular works of Wolfgang Amadeus Mozart, Robert Schumann, Johannes Brahms, Antonín Dvořák were transcribed for two piano eight hands. The majority of 8 hand piano music consists of transcriptions, or arrangements.

List of works
The following is an incomplete list of piano quartets by famous and lesser-known composers. Ordering is by surname of composer.

A-B 

Elfrida Andrée
Piano Quartet A minor (1870)
Henk Badings
Piano Quartet (1973)
Jeanne Barbillion
Quatuor avec piano
Béla Bartók
Piano Quartet in C minor (1898)
Arnold Bax
Piano Quartet, in one movement (1922)
Ludwig van Beethoven
Piano Quartet WoO 36, No. 1 in E-flat major (1785)
Piano Quartet WoO 36, No. 2 in D major (1785)
Piano Quartet WoO 36, No. 3 in C major (1785)
Opus 16/b: Piano Quartet in E-flat (1797) (arrangement of Quintet for Piano and Winds, Op. 16)
Paul Ben-Haim
Piano Quartet in C minor, Op.4 (1920)
Wilhelm Berger
Piano Quartet in A major, op. 21 (published 1887)
Piano Quartet in C minor, op. 100
Charles Auguste de Bériot
Piano Quartet in A minor, Op. 50 (1881)
Leopoldine Blahetka
Piano Quartet No. 1 in A major, Op. 43 (1836)
Piano Quartet No. 2 in E-flat major, Op. 44 (1837/38)

Arthur Bliss
Piano Quartet in A minor (1915)
Nancy Bloomer Deussen
Pacific City for Piano Quartet (2017)
Léon Boëllmann
Piano Quartet in F minor, Op. 10 (c. 1890)
William Bolcom
Piano Quartet (1976)
Mélanie Bonis
Piano Quartet No. 1 in B-flat major, Op. 69 (1905)
Piano Quartet No. 2 in D major, Op. 124 (1927)
Johannes Brahms
Piano Quartet No. 1 in G minor, Op. 25 (1859)
Piano Quartet No. 2 in A major, Op. 26 (1862)
Piano Quartet No. 3 in C minor, Op. 60 (1875)
Charlotte Bray
Replay (2011)
Zustände (2016)
Frank Bridge
Phantasy Piano Quartet in F-sharp minor, H. 94 (1910)
Dora Bright
Piano Quartet in D major (1893)
James Francis Brown
Piano Quartet (2004)'

C-D 

Alexis de Castillon
Piano Quartet in G minor, Op.7 (1869)
Georgy Catoire
Piano Quartet in A minor, Op.31 (1916)
Ernest Chausson
Piano Quartet in A major, Op.30 (1897)
Rhona Clarke
Undercurrent (2001)
Aaron Copland
Piano Quartet (1950)
Vincent d'Indy
Piano Quartet in A minor, Op.7 (1878–88)
Tina Davidson
Barefoot (2011) 
Leap (2020)
Peter Maxwell Davies
Piano Quartet (2007)

Emma Lou Diemer
Piano Quartet (1954)
Ernst von Dohnányi
Piano Quartet in F minor, (1894)
Théodore Dubois
Piano Quartet in A minor (1907)
Jan Ladislav Dussek
Piano Quartet in E-flat major (1804)
Antonín Dvořák
Piano Quartet No. 1 in D major, Op. 23 (1875)
Bagatelles, Op. 47 (for two violins, cello and harmonium (or piano); 1878)
Piano Quartet No. 2 in E-flat major, Op. 87 (1889)

E-F 

Danny Elfman
Piano Quartet (2017)
Rosalind Ellicott
Piano Quartet in D major (1895)
George Enescu
Piano Quartet No. 1 in D major, Op. 16 (1909)
Piano Quartet No. 2 in D minor, Op. 30 (1943–1944)
Gabriel Fauré
Piano Quartet No. 1 in C minor, Op. 15 (1876–79, Finale rev. 1883)
Piano Quartet No. 2 in G minor, Op. 45 (1885–86)
Morton Feldman
Piano, Violin, Viola, Cello (1987)
Zdeněk Fibich
Piano Quartet in E minor, Op. 11 (1874)
Graciane Finzi
Free Quartet (1984)
Elena Firsova
Frozen Time (2013-16)

Eugénie-Emilie Juliette Folville
1er Quatuor pour piano, Op. 9 (1885)
Jacqueline Fontyn
Musica a quattro for piano quartet (1966)
Arthur Foote
Piano Quartet in C major, Op. 23 (1890)
Erika Fox
Malinconia Militare for Piano Quartet (2003)
Richard Franck
Piano Quartet No.1 in A Major, Op.33 (1901)
Piano Quartet No.2 in E Major, Op.41 (1905)
Carl Frühling
Piano Quartet in D major, Op. 35
Robert Fuchs
Piano Quartet No. 1 in G minor, Op. 15 (1876)
Piano Quartet No. 2 in B minor, Op. 75 (1904)
Vivian Fung
Shifting Landscapes (2018)

G-H 

Hans Gál
Piano Quartet in B major, Op.13 (1914)
Friedrich Gernsheim
Piano Quartet No. 1 in E major, Op. 6 (1865)
Piano Quartet No. 2 in C minor, Op. 20 (performed in 2003. Pub. ca. 1870.)
Piano Quartet No. 3 in F major, Op. 47 (1883)
Ruth Gipps
Brocade, Op. 17 (1941)
Hermann Goetz
Piano quartet in E major Op. 6 (1867)
Reynaldo Hahn
Piano Quartet in G major
Ilmari Hannikainen
Piano Quartet in F-Sharp Minor
John Harbison
November 19, 1828 (1988)
Robert Helps
Piano Quartet (1997)
Louise Héritte-Viardot
Piano Quartet No. 1 in A major, Op. 9 (published in 1883)
Piano Quartet No. 2 in D major, Op. 11 (published in 1883)
Piano Quartet No. 3 in D minor (1877-1878)
Heinrich von Herzogenberg
Piano quartet No.1 in E minor, Op. 75 (1891-1892)
Piano quartet No. 2 in B major, Op. 95 (1897)

Alfred Hill
The Sacred Mountain (1932)
Wilhelm Hill
Piano Quartet in E major, Op. 44 (1879)
Ferdinand Hiller
Piano Quartet No. 1 in B minor, Op. 1 (1826)
Piano Quartet No. 2 in F minor, Op. 3 (1830)
Piano Quartet No. 3 in A minor, Op. 133 (1870)
Franz Anton Hoffmeister
Piano Quartet in G major (1785)
Piano Quartet in B-flat major (1788)
Herbert Howells
Piano Quartet in A minor, Op. 21 (1916-1st version, 1936-2nd version)
Hans Huber
Piano Quartet No.1 in B major, Op.110 (1891/2?)
Piano Quartet No.2 in E major, Op.117 (1901)
Ferdinand Hummel
Piano Quartet in C-sharp minor, Op. 19 (1879)
Johann Nepomuk Hummel
Piano Quartet in G major, Op. post. (2 movements; published in 1839)
William Hurlstone
Piano Quartet in E minor, Op. 43 (1906)

I-L 

Salomon Jadassohn
Piano Quartet 1 in C minor, Op.77 (1884)
Piano Quartet 2 in G major, Op.86 (1887)
Piano Quartet 3 in A minor, Op. 109 (1890)
Marie Jaëll
Piano Quartet in G minor (1875)
Gustav Jenner
Piano Quartet in F major (1905)
Robert Kahn
Piano Quartet No. 1 in b minor, Op. 14  (1891)
Piano Quartet No. 2 in a minor, Op. 30 (1899)
Piano Quartet No. 3 in c minor, Op. 41  (1904)
Hannah Kendall
Network Bed (2018)
Friedrich Kiel
Piano Quartet No. 1 in a minor, Op. 43 (1866)
Piano Quartet No. 2 in E major, Op. 44 (1866)
Piano Quartet No. 3 in G major, Op. 50 (1867)
Uuno Klami (1900-1961)
Piano Quartet in D major
Arnold Krug
Piano Quartet in C minor, Op. 17 (1879)
Friedrich Kuhlau
Piano Quartet No. 1 in C minor, Op. 32 (1820-1821)
Piano Quartet No. 2 in A major, Op. 50 (1822)
Piano Quartet No. 3 in G minor, Op. 108 (composed in 1829, published in 1833)

Josef Labor
Piano Quartet in C major, Op.6 (1893)
Paul Lacombe
Piano Quartet in C minor, Op. 101 (1904)
Libby Larsen
Over, Easy (2009)
Anne Lauber
Piano Quartet (1989)
Luise Adolpha Le Beau
Piano Quartet in F minor, Op. 28 (1883-1884)
Nicola Le Fanu
Miniature and Canon (2000)
Helvi Leiviskä
Piano Quartet in A Major, Op. 1 (1926)
Guillaume Lekeu
Piano Quartet in B minor - (incomplete, first and second movement only; 1893)
Lowell Liebermann
Piano Quartet Op.114 (2010)
Helene Liebmann
Grand Quatuor pour Pianoforte, Violon, Viola et Violoncelle in A-flat major, Op. 13
Ruth Lomon
Shadowing for Piano Quartet (1993)
Running with the Wolves for Piano Quartet (1994)

M 

Alexander Mackenzie
Piano Quartet in E major, Op. 11 (1873)
Gustav Mahler
Piano Quartet in A minor (only 1st movement completed; 1876)
Otto Malling
Piano Quartet in C minor, Op.80 (1904)
Joan Manén
Piano Quartet Op. A-6 "Mobilis in mobili" (1901)
Tera de Marez Oyens
Dublin Quartet (1989)
Heinrich Marschner
Piano Quartet No. 1 in B-flat major, Op. 36 (1827)
Piano Quartet No. 2 in G major, Op. 158 (1853)
Bohuslav Martinů
Piano Quartet, H. 287 (1942)
Emilie Mayer
Piano Quartet in E-flat major
Piano Quartet in G major

Piano Quartet (2015)

Fanny Mendelssohn
Piano Quartet in A-flat major, H-U No. 55 (1822)
Felix Mendelssohn
Piano Quartet in D minor (1821)
Piano Quartet No. 1 in C minor, Op. 1 (1822)
Piano Quartet No. 2 in F minor, Op. 2 (1823)
Piano Quartet No. 3 in B minor, Op. 3 (1825)
Elena Mendoza
Nebelsplitter for Piano, Violin, Viola and Cello (2007/2008)
Olivier Messiaen
Quatuor pour la fin du temps (for clarinet, violin, cello, and piano; 1941)
Darius Milhaud
Piano Quartet, Op. 417 (1966)
Bernhard Molique
Piano Quartet, Op. 71 in E-flat major (published 1870)
Wolfgang Amadeus Mozart
Piano Quartet No. 1 in G minor, K. 478 (1785)
Piano Quartet No. 2 in E-flat major, K. 493 (1786)

N-R 

Eduard Nápravník
Piano Quartet in A minor, Op.42 (1882)
Zygmunt Noskowski
Piano Quartet in D minor, Op. 8 (premiered in 1879, published in 1881)
Vítězslav Novák
 Piano Quartet in C minor, Op.7 (1894, rev. 1899)
Cornélie van Oosterzee 	
Piano Quartet in C-sharp minor (c. 1890)
Henrique Oswald
Piano Quartet No. 1 (Piccolo quartetto) in F-sharp minor, Op. 5 (1888)
Piano Quartet No. 2 in G major, Op. 26 (1898)
Hubert Parry
Piano Quartet in A-flat major (1882)
Dora Pejačević
Piano Quartet in D minor, Op. 25 (1908)
Walter Piston
Piano Quartet (1964)
Prince Louis Ferdinand of Prussia
Piano Quartet No. 1 in E-flat major (published 1806)
Piano Quartet No. 2 in F minor (published 1806)
Ebenezer Prout
Piano Quartet in C major, Op.2 (1865 ca.)
Piano Quartet No.2 in F major, Op.18 (1882?)

Osmo Tapio Räihälä
Les Oréades (2014)
Santa Ratniece
feu sur glace (2019)
Max Reger
Piano Quartet No. 1 in D minor, Op.113 (1910)
Piano Quartet No. 2 in A minor, Op.133 (1914)
Carl Reinecke
Piano Quartet in E-flat major, Op.34 (1853)
Piano Quartet in D major, Op.272 (1904)
Josef Gabriel Rheinberger
Piano Quartet in E flat major, Op. 38 (1870)
Ferdinand Ries
Piano Quartet in F minor, Op.13 (1808)
Piano Quartet in E-flat major, Op.17 (1809)
Piano Quartet in E minor No.3, Op.129 (1820 or 1822?)
Amanda Röntgen-Maier
Piano Quartet in E minor (1891)
Anton Rubinstein
Piano Quartet in C major, Op. 66 (1864)

S 

Camille Saint-Saëns
Piano Quartet in E major, Op. post (1851–53)
Serenade in E-flat major, Op. 15 (for violin, viola (or cello), organ, and piano; 1865)
Piano Quartet in B-flat major, Op. 41 (1875)
Caprice sur des airs danois et russes, Op. 79 (for flute, oboe, clarinet and piano; 1887)
Barcarolle in F major, Op. 108 (for violin, cello, harmonium, and piano; 1898)

Quartet for pianoforte, violin, viola and violoncello in C major, Op.14 (1908?)
Quartet for 2 violins, viola and violoncello in G major, Op.17 (1905)
Alfred Schnittke
Piano Quartet, based on a fragment by Gustav Mahler (1988)
Franz Schubert
Adagio and Rondo concertante in F major, D487 (1816)
Georg Schumann
Piano Quartet in F minor, Op. 29 (1901)
Robert Schumann
Piano Quartet in E-flat major, Op. 47 (1842)
Cyril Scott
Piano Quartet in E minor, Op. 16 (1899)
Johanna Senfter
Piano Quartet in E Minor, Op. 11
Piano Quartet in D Minor, Op. 112
Eric Sessler 
Piano Quartet (2004)
Vache Sharafyan 
"Adumbrations of the Peacock" for piano quartet (2003)
"Good-lights" four movements for piano quartet (2018)
Caroline Shaw
Thousandth Orange (2018)

Nikos Skalkottas
Scherzo for piano quartet (1939)
Alice Mary Smith
Piano Quartet No. 1 in B-flat major (1861)
Piano Quartet No. 2 in E major
Piano Quartet No. 3 in D major (1864)
Piano Quartet No. 4 in G minor (1867)
Linda Catlin Smith
Dark Flower (2020)
Marcelle Soulage
Piano Quartet (1925)
Charles Villiers Stanford
Piano Quartet No.1 in F Major, Op. 15 (1879)
Johann Franz Xaver Sterkel
Piano Quartet in B-flat major, StWV 157 (ca. 1804)
Richard Stöhr
Piano Quartet in D minor, Op.63
Richard Strauss
Piano Quartet in C minor, Op. 13 (1884–1885)
Rita Strohl
Quatuor pour piano et cordes en ré mineur (1891)
Josef Suk
Piano Quartet in A min, Op.1 (1891)
Freda Swain
The Sea (1938)

T-Z 

Dobrinka Tabakova
Goldberg Gymnopedie (2011)
Josef Tal
Piano Quartet for violin, viola, cello & piano (1982)
Sergei Taneyev
Piano Quartet in E major, Op. 20 (1906)
Ferdinand Thieriot
Piano Quartet in E major, Op.30 (1875)
Anna S. Þorvaldsdóttir
Shades of Silence (for violin, viola, cello & harpsichord; version for violin, viola, cello & piano also available; 2012)
Piano Quartet (2017)
Donald Tovey
Piano Quartet in E minor, Op. 12 (1913)
Joan Tower
White Granite for Piano Quartet (2010)
Eduard Tubin
Piano Quartet in C-sharp minor, ETW 59 (1930)
Joaquín Turina
Piano Quartet in A minor, Op. 67 (1931)
Stefania Turkewich
Piano Quartet
Gwyneth Van Anden Walker
Letters to the World (2001)
Earth and Sky for Violin, Viola, Cello, and Piano with Readers (2018)

Joelle Wallach
Runes and Ritual
William Walton
Piano Quartet in D minor
Johann Baptist Wanhal
Piano Quartet in E-flat major, Op. 40 No. 1
Piano Quartet in G major, Op. 40 No. 2
Piano Quartet in B-flat major, Op. 40 No. 3
Graham Waterhouse
Skylla and Charybdis (2014)
Carl Maria von Weber
Piano Quartet in B-flat major, J. 76 (1809)
Judith Weir
Piano Quartet (2000)
Charles-Marie Widor
Piano Quartet in A minor, Op. 66 (1891)
John Williams
Air and Simple Gifts (2009)
John Woolrich
Adagissimo (1997)
Sestina (1997)
Georg Hendrik Witte
Piano Quartet in A major, Op. 5 (1867)
Władysław Żeleński
Piano Quartet in C minor, Op. 61 (1907)

List of ensembles 
 Fauré Quartet
 Garth Newel Piano Quartet

See also 
 Classic 100 chamber (ABC)
 Mozart Piano Quartet

References

Further reading 
 Basil Smallman (1994) The Piano Quartet and Quintet: Style Structure, and Scoring, New York: Oxford University Press. .

External links
Piano Quartet Repertoire — A Comprehensive Listing of the piano quartet repertoire by major composers at the New Zealand Piano Quartet website
Ames Piano Quartet
 Public Domain Piano Quartet Scores from IMSLP

Piano
Chamber music
Types of musical groups